Erumduli Barlas (Mongolian: Эрумдули Барлас) living during 12th Centuries was a Borjigin Prince, a Military Commander, Advisor of Mongols he serving his great uncle Khabul Khan (d. 1148/49) who was the founder of Khamag Mongol Confederation and Ambaghai Khan, and also Hotula Khan who was the leader of Taichud Clan, he was the Grandson of Tumbinai Khan through his son Khaduli, as well as his Grandson Qarachar Noyan who was the founder of Barlas tribe and the paternal ancestor of Timur. his son suqu sechen also served Khamag Mongolia as state official.
Borjigin
12th-century Mongolian people

Life

References 

Mongol Empire people